Victor H. Overman (October 26, 1922 – August 22, 2011) was an American high school and college football coach. He served as the head football coach at Franklin College in Franklin, Indiana from 1953 to 1954.

Overman was a quarterback at Ball State University from 1942 to 1945.

Head coaching record

College

References

1922 births
2011 deaths
American football quarterbacks
Ball State Cardinals football players
Franklin Grizzlies football coaches
High school football coaches in Indiana
People from Westfield, Indiana
Players of American football from Indiana